Braunston-in-Rutland is a village and civil parish in the county of Rutland in the East Midlands of England.  The population of the civil parish was 392 at the 2001 census, including Brooke and increasing to  502 at the 2011 census.  Leicestershire lies on the parish's western boundary

The village's name means 'farm/settlement of Brant'. Alternatively, the personal name could be 'Brandr', a Scandinavian name.

Braunston is located roughly three miles (4.8 km) south-west of the county town of Oakham. The River Gwash flows through the village.

The village retains two public houses, The Old Plough, and the 17th-century Blue Ball Inn. 

All Saints' Church has a circular churchyard. A sculpted stone stands in the churchyard, at the west end of the church, close to the tower. Known as the Braunston "Goddess", it was found in about 1920 when the church doorstep needed to be replaced; when the slab was lifted, the carving was revealed on the underside. There has been considerable speculation as to its age and meaning, and its original position as part of the church building, or whether it may even predate the church. It is not a gargoyle as it has no drainage channel. It may have had an apotropaic purpose.

References

External links

 At the Edge article on the Braunston "Goddess"
Sheela Na Gig Project article on the Braunston figure 
Step back in time in Rutland, The Observer, The Guardian, January 25, 2009
Braunston Church Website
The Blue Ball, Rutland's oldest inn
The Old Plough
Braunston Parish Council website

Villages in Rutland
Civil parishes in Rutland